The Copa América Centenario Final was an association football match that took place on 26 June 2016 at the MetLife Stadium in East Rutherford, New Jersey, United States to determine the winner of the Copa América Centenario.

The match was contested by Argentina and Chile, making it a rematch of the 2015 final. At this tournament, Argentina and Chile soon faced each other in Group D, and the victory belonged to Argentina with a score of 2-1.  But in the final, like the last one, Chile ultimately won on penalty kicks after a 0–0 draw, with Chile scoring their last 4 penalties after going first and 2 Argentines missing. However, Chile won 4-2 this time. Forward Lionel Messi announced his retirement from international football after the defeat, his third consecutive final defeat with Argentina, although he later reversed this decision.

Background
This edition of the Copa América was the first hosted by the United States. The match marked the sixth time Argentina reached the final since the tournament was rebranded Copa América in 1975. They also finished in the top two in 22 editions of the tournament's predecessor, the Campeonato Sudamericano, in which winners were decided in a single group stage with no final match. At this time, Argentina's last international tournament win had been the Copa America in 1993. Meanwhile, this was Chile's fourth final appearance, having also finished in the top two in 1955 and 1956. Chile were the defending champions, having won their first international title in the previous year's edition as the host nation.

Route to the final

Closing ceremony
Pitbull and Becky G performed the official song of the tournament, "Superstar", immediately following the match and trophy ceremony.

Match
As part of FIFA's approval of rule changes based on IFAB's new regulations, a fourth substitute was allowed in extra time. However, neither team used the fourth substitution after the match went into extra time.

Details

|valign="top"|
|valign="top" width="50%"|

Statistics

Post-match
Chile won their second consecutive final and defended the Copa América after their win in 2015, while Argentina lost their third consecutive final (preceded by the 2014 World Cup and 2015 Copa América). The match had an attendance of 82,026, the largest in the history of New Jersey.

Lionel Messi announced his retirement from international football after the match, saying "I've done all I can. It hurts not to be a champion." Argentine newspaper La Nación speculated that other players, including Sergio Agüero, Javier Mascherano and Gonzalo Higuaín were set to retire. ESPN Deportes reported that Ángel Di María, Lucas Biglia, Ezequiel Lavezzi and Éver Banega could potentially retire as well. On 12 August 2016, Messi reverted his decision and announced his comeback to international football, saying "There were too many things in my head during the day of the last final and I seriously thought about letting it go, but I love my country and this jersey so much." Three of the aforementioned players (Agüero, Di María and Messi) would eventually win their first international title at the Copa América five years later. They would also go on to win the 2022 World Cup, with Messi and Di Maria scoring in the final.

References

External links
Copa América Centenario official website

Final
2016
2016
2016 in Argentine football
2015–16 in Chilean football
2016
June 2016 sports events in the United States
Sports competitions in East Rutherford, New Jersey
2016 in sports in New Jersey
21st century in East Rutherford, New Jersey
Copa America Final 2016
Argentina at the Copa América
Chile at the Copa América